Ghoraniyeh or El Ghorahiyeh is a crossing (ford) by the Jordan River south of Wadi Nimrin on the left bank where it joins Wadi an Nuway'imah (Nuei'ameh, Nu'eima, etc.) on the right bank. During the Ottoman times there was a bridge, destroyed during the World War I by the retreating Ottomans. During the war it was an important bridgehead.

References

Bridges over the Jordan River
Palestine (region)